Winnie Ho Wing-yin is the current Secretary for Housing in Hong Kong, appointed on 1 July 2022 as part of John Lee's administration.

Biography 
According to her government profile, Ho was a graduate of the Faculty of Architecture from the University of Hong Kong. Ho joined the government in 1992 as an Architect, was promoted to Chief Architect in 2009, Government Architect in 2012, and Deputy Director of Architectural Services in 2018, and Director of Architectural Services in 2020. In July 2022, she was appointed as Secretary for Housing.

Separately, she works in the Energizing Kowloon East Office of the Development Bureau as Deputy Head.

In August 2022, news outlets reported that Ho and her husband bought a flat for HK$12.5 million in 2006 with illegal structures, and the government's Buildings Department ordered the structures removed in 2008. The structures were not removed until 2021, 13 years after the order was issued.

In November 2022, Ho said that even though John Lee announced the target to be 4.5 years, the government's goal for public housing wait times is 3 years.

In December 2022, Ho revealed that "light public housing" with 16-18 floors would cost HK$680,000 per unit, more than public permanent housing, which cost HK$650,000 per unit. Some lawmakers criticized the cost, saying that the government was not transparent in its cost breakdown. Other people complained that the 4 sites chosen for light public housing were in remote areas.

In January 2023, Ho said that light public housing units would not include air conditioning, in order to reduce costs by about HK$200 million.

Personal life 
Ho declared that she and her husband own a property in Singapore. In total, Ho owns 3 properties in Hong Kong and 1 in Singapore.

In August 2022, a family member tested positive for COVID-19, and Ho underwent quarantine. In October 2022, Ho's driver tested positive for COVID-19.

References 

Living people
Hong Kong
Year of birth missing (living people)
Alumni of the University of Hong Kong

Women members of the Executive Council of Hong Kong